The Elliott 503 was a transistorized computer introduced by Elliott Brothers in 1963. It was software-compatible with the earlier Elliott 803 but was about 70 times faster and a more powerful machine. About 32 units were sold. The basic configuration had 8192 words of 39 bits each for main memory, and operated at a system clock speed of 6.7 megahertz.

See also
 List of transistorized computers
 Cluff–Foster–Idelson code

References

0803
Early British computers
Transistorized computers
Computer-related introductions in 1963